LYO may refer to:

Leeds Youth Opera
Louisiana Youth Orchestras
Louisville Youth Orchestra
Lubavitch Youth Organization

See also
Lyø